Allium jacquemontii is a plant species native to India, Pakistan, Afghanistan, Tajikistan, Xizang (Tibet) and Xinjiang.

Umbel forms a hemisphere of many densely packed red or purple flowers.

Taxonomy
The Latin specific epithet jacquemontii refers to the French botanist and geologist Victor Jacquemont (1844–1912).

References

jacquemontii
onions
flora of China
flora of Pakistan
flora of Tajikistan
flora of Tibet
flora of West Himalaya
flora of Xinjiang
plants described in 1843
plants described in 1967